Leosedulia is a monotypic genus of grasshoppers in the subfamily Catantopinae and tribe Gereniini.  The single species, Leosedulia mistshenkoi, has been found in Indo-China (Cambodia).

References

External links 
 

Acrididae genera
Catantopinae 
Orthoptera of Indo-China
Monotypic Orthoptera genera